The Order of Bohdan Khmelnytsky is a Ukrainian military award named after  Bohdan Khmelnytsky, Hetman of the Ukrainian Cossacks. The award was established on May 3, 1995 by Ukrainian president Leonid Kuchma to commemorate the 50th anniversary of the end of the Second World War in Europe. It is the only Ukrainian Knightly Order.

Medals and ribbons

See also 
Order of Bogdan Khmelnitsky (Soviet Union)

External links 
 president.gov.ua – Order of Bohdan Khmelnytskyi

 
Awards established in 1995
1995 establishments in Ukraine
Military awards and decorations of Ukraine